The IEEE Undergraduate Teaching Award is a Technical Field Award of the IEEE that was established by the IEEE Board of Directors in 1990.  It is presented for inspirational teaching of undergraduate students in the fields of interest of the IEEE.

This award may be given to an individual only.

Recipients of this award receive a bronze medal, certificate, and honorarium.

Recipients
The recipients of the IEEE Undergraduate Teaching Award include the following people:

 2021: Cristine Agra Pimentel
 2020: Rajesh Kannan Megalingam
 2019: Lisa Gresham Huettel
 2018: Susan Lord
 2017: Bonnie Heck Ferri
 2016: Terri Fiez 
 2015: Branislav M. Notaros
 2014: Hsi-Tseng Chou
 2013: Charles Kenneth Alexander 
 2012: Santosh K. Kurinec 
 2011: Raghunath Shevgaonkar 
 2010: Ned Mohan 
 2009: John C. Bean 
 2008: Muhammad Harunur Rashid	
 2007: Clayton R. Paul		
 2006: John B. Peatman		
 2005: Yannis Tsividis		
 2004: Richard C. Jaeger	
 2003: Mehrdad Ehsani		
 2002: No Award		
 2001: No Award		
 2000: Haniph A. Lachman 
 1999: Michael G. Pecht 
 1998: J. David Irwin
 1997: Chand R. Viswanathan	
 1996: Karan L. Watson
 1996: David A. Patterson
 1995: David G. Meyer		
 1994: N. Narayana Rao		
 1993: Ronald G. Hoelzeman	
 1992: James W. Nilsson

References 

Undergraduate Teaching Award
Computer science education